Ivan Dragićević (born 21 October 1981) is a Serbian football defender.

Dragićević has played for FK Dinamo Pančevo, FK Mogren, FK Budućnost Banatski Dvor, FK Smederevo, Shirin Faraz and Damash Gilan in his career.

Many websites are confusing him and the Croatian footballer with same name and born same year, that plays with NK Žepče.

Career stats

External links
 FK Smederevo Profile
 Profile and stats at Srbijafudbal.
 
 Ivan Dragičević Stats at Utakmica.rs

Living people
1981 births
Serbian footballers
Serbian expatriate footballers
FK Dinamo Pančevo players
FK Mogren players
FK Budućnost Banatski Dvor players
FK Napredak Kruševac players
FK BASK players
FK Smederevo players
Knattspyrnufélag Akureyrar players
Serbian SuperLiga players
Shirin Faraz Kermanshah players
Pegah Gilan players
Damash Gilan players
Expatriate footballers in Iran
Damash Iranian players
Expatriate footballers in Malaysia
Serbian expatriate sportspeople in Malaysia
Sime Darby F.C. players
Malaysia Super League players
Association football defenders